Trestonia lateapicata is a species of beetle in the family Cerambycidae. It was described by Martins and Galileo in 2010. It is known from Bolivia.

References

lateapicata
Beetles described in 2010